The Boardwalk Bowl was a post-season college football game held at the former Atlantic City Convention Center (now Boardwalk Hall) in Atlantic City, New Jersey, from 1961 to 1973.

History
Inaugurated in 1961, the game featured an annual matchup between Pennsylvania Military College (now Widener University) and the United States Merchant Marine Academy, known as the "Little Army–Navy Game" until 1967.  The playing surface in the earlier years consisted of natural grass sod that was grown outside and then moved indoors for the game.

In 1968, it succeeded the Tangerine Bowl as one of the four regional finals in the College Division (which became Division II and Division III in 1973). The other three regionals were the Pecan (later Pioneer), Grantland Rice, and Camellia bowls. In 1973, under a new playoff system, the Boardwalk Bowl became a Division II national quarterfinal, while the other three quarterfinals were nameless and played at campus sites. The semifinals were the Pioneer and Grantland Rice bowls, and the Camellia was the championship game. After 1973, the Boardwalk Bowl was discontinued as the NCAA eventually moved the Division II semifinals to unnamed games at campus venues, similar to earlier rounds.

The Boardwalk Bowl, along with the Liberty Bowl (played in the Convention Center in December 1964), showed the feasibility of playing football indoors and led the promoters of football games to look seriously at developing indoor facilities primarily for this purpose.

Game results

See also
 List of college bowl games

References

Defunct college football bowls
Indoor American football competitions
Sports competitions in Atlantic City, New Jersey
American football in New Jersey